Owen Leslie Williams (born 8 April 1932) is a former South African cricketer. Williams was a right-handed batsman who bowled slow left-arm orthodox. He was born at Claremont, Cape Province.

Williams made his first-class debut in England for Warwickshire against Scotland at Edgbaston in 1967. He later made two further first-class appearances in South Africa for Western Province, against Transvaal in December 1971 and Natal in January 1972. In his three first-class matches, he took a total of 5 wickets at an average of 36.60, with best figures of 2/36. With the bat, he scored 21 runs at a batting average of 10.50, with a high score of 9 not out.

In an attempt to make South African cricket more acceptable to world opinion and to ensure the tour to Australia in 1971-72 went ahead, the South African cricket authorities offered Williams and another non-white player, Dik Abed, a place on the touring team. However, not only did the South African government refuse to allow the initiative to proceed, but Williams and Abed also refused to be a part of what they considered a token gesture.

References

External links
Owen Williams at ESPNcricinfo
Owen Williams at CricketArchive

1932 births
Living people
Cricketers from Cape Town
South African cricketers
Warwickshire cricketers
Western Province cricketers